City is a ward in the metropolitan borough of the City of Bradford, West Yorkshire, England. It contains over 180 listed buildings that are recorded in the National Heritage List for England. Of these, three are listed at Grade I, the highest of the three grades, seven are at Grade II*, the middle grade, and the others are at Grade II, the lowest grade. The ward consists of the central area of the city, and districts to the north west towards Manningham, and to the southwest towards Great Horton.

Until the coming of the Industrial Revolution, Bradford was a market town. From the later part of the 18th century, industries developed and grew, particularly the woollen industry, until in the 1860s, it was considered to be "the worldwide capital of the worsted textile industry". The listed buildings reflect this history. Only a few date from before 1800, and these are the parish church, later the cathedral, houses and a private house. The great majority date from the middle of the 19th century, and they reflect the growing textile industry and the prosperity arising from this, in the construction of elaborately decorated public buildings, and, in the area of Little Germany, large and impressive warehouses.


Key

Buildings

References

Citations

Sources

Lists of listed buildings in West Yorkshire
Listed